D. Gnanasigamony was an Indian politician and former Member of the Legislative Assembly. He was elected to the Tamil Nadu legislative assembly as a Communist Party of India (Marxist) candidate from Vilavancode constituency in Kanyakumari district in 1977 election.

References 

Communist Party of India (Marxist) politicians from Tamil Nadu
Members of the Tamil Nadu Legislative Assembly